The 2018 World Snooker Championship (officially the 2018 Betfred World Snooker Championship) was a professional snooker tournament held from 21 April to 7 May 2018 at the Crucible Theatre in Sheffield, England. Hosted by the World Professional Billiards and Snooker Association, it was the 20th and final ranking event of the 2017–18 snooker season and the 42nd consecutive time the World Snooker Championship had been held at the venue. The tournament was broadcast by BBC Sport and Eurosport in Europe, and sponsored by betting company Betfred.

Welsh left-hander Mark Williams won his third world championship and 21st ranking title, defeating Scottish professional John Higgins 18–16 in the final. Williams' victory came 15 years after his second world title in 2003; before the start of the season, he had not won a ranking event in the previous six years. In winning the event, Williams received the highest prize money awarded for a snooker event, £425,000 of a total pool of £1,968,000. Aged 43, he is the third oldest winner at the crucible after Ronnie O'Sullivan who was 44 when he won the 2020 World Snooker Championship and Ray Reardon who was 45 when he won the title in 1978. Defending and three-time world champion Mark Selby had won the world title for the previous two years, but lost in the first round 4–10 to Joe Perry.

The highest  of the championship was scored by Higgins, who made a break of 146 in frame 13 of his second round win over Jack Lisowski. However, in qualifying for the event, Liang Wenbo scored a maximum break of 147.

Background 
The World Snooker Championship is an annual cue sport tournament and is the official world championship of the game of snooker. Snooker was founded in the late 19th century by British Army soldiers stationed in India. The sport originated by players from the United Kingdom, and later players from Europe and the Commonwealth. In more modern times, the sport has transferred to being played worldwide, specifically in Southeast Asia, such as in China, Thailand and Hong Kong. The world championship was the final event of the 2017/18 snooker calendar, with the winner of the event being crowned as the professional world champion of the sport.

The world championship sees 32 professional players compete in one-on-one snooker matches in a single elimination format, each played over several . The 32 players for the event are selected through a mix of the world snooker rankings and a pre-tournament qualification round. The first world championship in 1927, held in Camkin's Hall, Birmingham, England, was won by Joe Davis. Since 1977, the event has been held in the Crucible Theatre in Sheffield.

, Stephen Hendry and  Ronnie O’Sullivan are the event's most successful participants in the modern era, having both won the championship seven times. The previous year's championship had been won by England's Mark Selby, who won the event defeating Scotland's John Higgins in the final 18–15. This was Selby's third championship, having won previously in 2014 and 2016. The champion of the 2018 event would win prize money of £425,000, from a total pool of £1,968,000.

Format 

The 2018 World Snooker Championship was held between 21 April and 7 May 2018 in Sheffield, England. The tournament was the last of twenty rankings events in the 2017/2018 season on the World Snooker Tour. It featured a 32-player main draw that was played at the Crucible Theatre, as well as a 128-player qualifying draw which took place at the English Institute of Sport from 11 to 18 April 2018, finishing three days prior to the start of the main draw. This was the 42nd consecutive year the tournament was held at the Crucible, and the 50th consecutive year the championship was contested through the modern knockout format.

The top 16 players in the latest world rankings automatically qualified for the main draw as seeded players. Defending champion Mark Selby was automatically seeded 1st overall. The remaining fifteen seeds were allocated based on the latest world rankings (revision 10), which were released following the China Open, the penultimate event of the season. With Selby ranked as the world number 1 entering the event, every player's seed therefore corresponded to their respective world ranking. Matches in the first round of the main draw were played as best of 19 frames. The number of frames needed to win a match increased with each successive round, leading up to the final match which was played as best of 35 frames.

All 16 non-seeded spots in the main draw were filled with players from the qualifying rounds. The qualifying draw consisted of 128 players, including 113 of the remaining 115 players on the World Snooker Tour, as well as fifteen wildcard places allotted to non-tour players. These invited players included the women's world champion, the European junior champion, and all four semi-finalists at the amateur championship. As with the main draw, half of the participants in the qualifying draw were seeded players. Every player ranked from 17th to 80th was allocated one of 64 seeds in order of their ranking, while all of the other participants were placed randomly into the draw. In order to reach the main draw at the Crucible, players needed to win three best of 19 frame matches.

Participant summary 
Eight former world champions participated in the main tournament: Ronnie O'Sullivan (five titles: 2001, 2004, 2008, 2012, 2013), John Higgins (four titles: 1998, 2007, 2009, 2011), Mark Selby (three titles and two-time defending champion: 2014, 2016, 2017), Mark Williams (two titles: 2000 and 2003), Shaun Murphy (one title: 2005), Graeme Dott (one title: 2006), Neil Robertson (one title: 2010), and Stuart Bingham (one title: 2015). This was O'Sullivan's 26th consecutive appearance in the final stages of the World Championship since his debut in 1993, just one short of Stephen Hendry's record of 27 consecutive appearances and four short of Steve Davis's record of 30 total appearances. Five other former world championship finalists also competed: Matthew Stevens (twice: 2000 and 2005), Ali Carter (twice: 2008 and 2012), Judd Trump (once: 2011), Barry Hawkins (once: 2013), and Ding Junhui (once: 2016). The youngest player to participate in the main stage of the tournament was Lyu Haotian at 20 years of age, while 43-year-old Joe Perry was the oldest; both players entered the main draw through qualifying. Marco Fu made his return to competition at the World Championship, having missed much of the 2017/2018 season after undergoing surgery to repair retinal degeneration and myodesopsia in his left eye.

Three former world champions participated in the qualifying rounds: Ken Doherty (1997), Peter Ebdon (2002) and Graeme Dott (2006). Of these, only Dott succeeded in qualifying for the main tournament at the Crucible. Also, three former world finalists participated in the qualifying rounds: Jimmy White (six times: 1984 and 1990–1994), Nigel Bond (once: 1995) and Matthew Stevens (twice: 2000 and 2005). Of these, only Stevens qualified for the main tournament at the Crucible. The youngest participant in qualifying was Jackson Page at 16 years of age, while 55-year-old Jimmy White was the oldest participant; however, neither player qualified.

Prize fund 
The breakdown of prize money for 2018 is shown below.

 Winner: £425,000
 Runner-up: £180,000
 Semi-finalists: £85,000
 Quarter-finalists: £42,500
 Last 16: £27,500
 Last 32: £18,000

 Last 48: £13,500
 Last 80: £9,000
 Televised highest break: £10,000
 Non-televised highest break: £1,000
 Total: £1,968,000

The latter prize was claimed by Liang Wenbo during his first qualifying round match against Rod Lawler.

Summary

Qualifying rounds 

The qualifying rounds took place at the English Institute of Sport from 11 to 18 April 2018. In the first round of qualifying, Liang Wenbo achieved his third professional maximum break, and his second of the 2017/2018 season, in the 10th frame of his match against Rod Lawler. It was the second consecutive year a 147 was made in World Championship qualifying, and the fourth time overall. Liang came very close to becoming the first player to score two maximums in the same match, but he missed the final black after a break of 140 in the last frame. Liang was eliminated in the third round of qualifying; ranked at world number 19, he was the highest-ranked player not to feature in the main draw of the tournament, as both world number 17 Ryan Day and world number 18 Stephen Maguire qualified.

Only seven of the 64 unseeded participants in qualifying (players ranked outside the world's top 80) made it through the first qualifying round, and only one of those seven, Adam Duffy, progressed to the third qualifying round. Duffy did not, however, qualify for the main draw at the Crucible. Four players qualified for the Crucible for the first time: Lyu Haotian, Liam Highfield, Thepchaiya Un-Nooh, and Chris Wakelin. Lyu was the lowest ranked player to reach the main stage, at world number 68.

First round 

The draw for the opening round of the main tournament was conducted on 19 April 2018, two days before the start of the competition. Technical issues delayed the 10:00 BST start time by two hours, to 12:00. The matches for the first round were spread out over six days from 21 to 26 April, and played using a two table setup in the Crucible Theatre. Each first round match was played over two sessions, as best of 19 frames (10 frames needed to win). Players and spectators criticised the two-hour delay to the tournament's first-round draw, which was caused by "technical issues". World number 22 Joe Perry called the draw "an absolute joke", claiming the delay caused qualifiers to "have no idea when [they] are playing, have to book hotels and make travel plans".

Of the sixteen first round matches, six ended with qualifiers defeating seeded players. The biggest upset of the round happened in the opening match, when Joe Perry defeated the defending champion and world number 1 Mark Selby. Perry won the first four frames before pulling away to 7–2 ahead after the first session of play. Selby was unable to catch Perry and was defeated 4–10, ending his 10-match undefeated streak in the world championships, as well as his two-year reign as world champion. The next highest ranked player to lose was world number 8 Shaun Murphy, who was upset by world number 51 Jamie Jones in a tight 10–9 match, where the scores were level at various stages.

The other four seeds to lose were the players ranked 10 through 13 in the world. Chinese debutant Lyu Haotian, both the youngest and lowest ranked player in the draw, defeated world number 11 Marco Fu in Fu's return to the Tour after eye surgery. Lyu was the only debutant to advance; he was 6–3 up after the first session and went on to win the match 10–5. Robert Milkins defeated world number 10 Neil Robertson 10–5. Jack Lisowski defeated world number 12 Stuart Bingham 10–7, thereby securing his first world championship match win in his second attempt. The 2015 world champion Bingham stated he was going to take a leave of absence from the sport after the loss. Bingham said he wanted to "spend some time with the family and put my cue down for a while". Bingham had spent three months of the season serving a ban for betting infringements; he commented, "It's not been the best of seasons in general, but on the table I've been pretty good." Ricky Walden defeated world number 13 Luca Brecel 10–6; he was comfortably five frames ahead at 8–3, when Brecel won the next three frames to bring the score to 8–6, before Walden won the last two frames of the match.

Of the eight former world champions playing in the main stage of the tournament, only three progressed to the second round: Ronnie O'Sullivan (five-time champion), John Higgins (four-time champion) and Mark Williams (two-time champion). All three were top seven seeds and had turned professional in the same year, 1992. Ronnie O'Sullivan trailed 0–4 and then 3–6 after the opening session in his match against Stephen Maguire but then won seven of the last eight frames to win 10–7. The 16th frame of this encounter was O'Sullivan's 1000th frame win at the Crucible. This was also his 15th consecutive first round victory at the world championships. John Higgins defeated Thai debutant Thepchaiya Un-Nooh 10–7. Both players attempted maximum breaks: Higgins missed the 14th red ball on 104 in the 8th frame of the first session; Un-Nooh scored 14 reds with blacks, on course for his second career maximum, before missing the 15th red on 112 in the 12th frame of the final session. Mark Williams defeated Jimmy Robertson in his first round match 10–5. Williams led 7–2 after the initial session, then he hit a tournament highest break (at that point) of 140 in the 13th frame, to go 9–4 ahead, before winning the match after two further frames.

In addition to O'Sullivan, Ali Carter and Anthony McGill both advanced despite trailing by three frames in the middle of their matches. Carter defeated Graeme Dott 10–8 in his first round match, despite being behind 3–6 overnight. McGill defeated Ryan Day 10–8; after trailing 5–8 earlier in the match, McGill won the last five frames to secure his place in the second round. He said he could not believe he had won, and the BBC referred to McGill's win as an "unbelievable comeback". The closing match of the first round saw the second final frame decider, after Jones's upset of Murphy. Recovering from 4–8 behind against Judd Trump, debutant Chris Wakelin won four frames in a row, to draw level at 8–8. The two players shared the next two frames, bringing the score to nine apiece, before Trump took the deciding frame.

The winners of the remaining matches of the round were Kyren Wilson, Mark Allen, Barry Hawkins, and Ding Junhui. Wilson defeated Matthew Stevens 10–3. In the 12th frame, Stevens accidentally nudged the pink ball with his hand and declared a foul on himself, which allowed Wilson to win the frame, extending his lead to 9–3. Allen, the reigning Masters champion, defeated debutant Liam Highfield 10–5; neither player scored a century, although Highfield came close with two breaks of 99. Hawkins defeated Stuart Carrington 10–7, after winning a 55-minute 14th frame. For the second successive year, Ding faced a fellow Chinese player in the first round of the tournament; having defeated Zhou Yuelong in 2017, he faced Xiao Guodong in 2018. Ding came out as a convincing 10–3 winner, despite losing the opening two frames of the match.

Second round 
The second round matches were played as best of 25 frames (13 frames needed to win), each over three sessions using a two table setup. The first match of the second round was between Mark Allen and Joe Perry, who defeated the defending champion in the first round. After sharing the first two sessions of their second round match at 8–8, Allen won all five frames in the third session to go through to the quarter-finals with a 13–8 win.

Barry Hawkins defeated Lyu Haotian 13–10 in their second round match, to enter the quarter-finals for the sixth consecutive year. The pair were level at 10–10 before Hawkins won the last three frames of the match. Ali Carter played Ronnie O'Sullivan in the second round, a rematch of both the 2008 and the 2012 World Championship finals. The two players came into contact and exchanged words after the 19th frame of the match. The pair had brushed shoulders, in an incident the Independent described as a "barge". Following the match, O'Sullivan described it as being "overplayed" by the media. Having defeated O'Sullivan on only one occasion from a total of seventeen attempts in the group stages of the non-ranking 2010 Championship League, Carter eventually triumphed 13–9 to advance to the quarter-finals.

Kyren Wilson secured a place in the quarter-finals by defeating Jamie Jones 13–5, winning all of the last six frames of the match. During a clearance in the penultimate frame, Wilson played a screw shot which jumped the cueball off the table, damaging the head of his cue tip. John Higgins defeated Jack Lisowski 13–1, with a session to spare; Lisowski scored his only frame of the match at 0–10 behind. In the 13th frame, Higgins scored a break of 146, one point short of a maximum. This was Higgins' highest break at the Crucible (until 147 in the 2020 tournament), and it was the highest anyone scored in the 2018 tournament.

The remaining three matches of the second round finished with Ding Junhui defeating Anthony McGill 13–4, after having won the first session of their match 8–0 and scoring seven 50+ breaks. Judd Trump defeated Ricky Walden 13–9, taking a late lead after the score drew level at 8–8 following the first two sessions. Mark Williams defeated Robert Milkins, 13–7, thereby eliminating the only remaining qualifier in the competition.

Quarter-finals 
The quarter-finals were also played as best of 25 frames, each over three sessions using a two table setup, with the four matches played on 1 and 2 May 2018. All eight of the quarter-finalists were seeded players, with Mark Allen the lowest ranked player left in the competition at world number 16. Barry Hawkins defeated Ding Junhui 13–5, to make it through to his fifth Crucible semi-final in six years. Kyren Wilson played Mark Allen, in a repeat of the 2018 Masters final just over three months prior. Despite having lost to Allen in that match, Wilson took an 11–5 lead over Allen overnight, eventually winning the match 13–6. With this victory, Wilson made it through to his first ever Crucible semi-final, having lost in the quarter-finals in the previous two World Championships. Mark Williams took leads of 5–3 and 9–7 after the first two sessions against Ali Carter. Williams then won four of the last five frames, with four breaks of 100 or more, to defeat Carter 13–8.

The closest quarter-final was the last match, between John Higgins and Judd Trump, which was a rematch of the 2011 World Championship final. Trump gained an early lead in the second session at 7–3, but Higgins won the next five frames, and the pair finished the session at 8–8. Trump won the next two frames and took a two-frame lead at 11–9, before Higgins won the next three frames to retake the lead at 12–11. Trump won the 24th frame to force a final frame decider, which Higgins won to clinch the match, later describing it as a "classic" and joking that Trump "must hate the sight of him".

Semi-finals 

The first semi-final was between John Higgins and Kyren Wilson. Higgins took an early lead in the opening session, leading Wilson 5–3, and retained this lead into the next two sessions, at 9–7, and 13–11. The pair shared the next four frames to leave the match at 15–13, before Higgins won the final two frames to win 17–13.

The second semi-final was between Barry Hawkins and Mark Williams. Hawkins took a similar lead over Williams, with Hawkins taking 5–3, 9–7, and 13–11 leads, before going into the final session. Williams made a comeback, drawing level at 14 frames apiece, and then again at 15 all. Williams took the lead for the first time in the match at 16–15, before winning it 17–15. His victory ensured that, for the first time since the World Championship moved to the Crucible in 1977, both finalists would be over 40 years old.

Final 
The two finalists were John Higgins and Mark Williams; both former champions. The final was played as a best of 35 frames match (18 frames needed to win), spread over four sessions between 6 and 7 May 2018. Williams took an early lead in the first session of the match, winning all of the first four frames. Higgins won the second mini-session 3–1, so the first session ended with a 5–3 lead for Williams. In the second session, Williams took the next two frames to lead 7–3, before Higgins scored four consecutive frames to level the score at 7–7. Williams then pulled away once again, winning the final three frames to take a 10–7 lead overnight.

Williams won the first four frames on the second day of the final, extending his winning streak to seven frames and his lead to 14–7, before Higgins pulled two frames back after the mid-session interval. In the second of those frames, Higgins won with a 72 counter-clearance after Williams missed on a break of 65. In the following frame, Higgins started on a maximum break, which had never been achieved in a World Championship final; he potted ten reds with blacks but could not complete the clearance. Nevertheless, he secured his third successive frame with the break of 80, reducing his deficit to 10–14. Williams took the last frame to win the session 5–3, giving him a 15–10 lead heading into the final session of the championship.

Higgins responded by winning the first five frames of the final session to level the match at 15–15, including three clearances and a match highest break of 131. Williams then won his first frame of the evening, and followed it up with a 100 break to take the score to 17–15, thus requiring one further frame to round off the match. In the 33rd frame, on a break of 63, Williams missed a pink that would have clinched the title; Higgins then cleared the table for a break of 65 to pull the score to 16–17. In the 34th frame, Williams held his nerve to make a match-winning break of 69, concluding the match at 18–16 and securing his third world title.

On winning the championship, Williams said "The turnaround in the past twelve months is something I cannot work out", after not having appeared in the competition in the previous season. Before the tournament, Williams had said if he won the world title he would attend the post tournament press conference naked. Following his victory, Williams entered the conference wearing only a towel around his waist, but removed it when he was safely seated behind a table. Williams then promised that if he was to win the next season, he would "cartwheel round here naked".

Williams' victory came fifteen years after his last world title in 2003; this was the longest span between two successive wins in the history of the tournament. At the age of 43, Williams became the oldest world champion since Ray Reardon won the event in 1978 aged 45. At the 2020 World Snooker Championship, O'Sullivan won the event at the age of 44.)

Main draw 
The numbers in parentheses are players' seedings. Players listed in bold indicate match winner.

Qualifying 
There were 128 players in the qualifying competition. The qualifying event was played in three rounds, with the 16 winners of the third round matches progressing to the main stages of the tournament at the Crucible Theatre in Sheffield. Qualifying took place between 11 and 18 April 2018 at the English Institute of Sport, also in Sheffield, in a 12-table setup. All matches were best of 19 frames.

A total of 113 tour players (ranked outside the top 16, including Invitational Tour Card holders Ken Doherty and Jimmy White) were joined by 15 amateur players who had achieved success through the World Professional Billiards and Snooker Association (WPBSA) qualifying criteria. Among the 131 World Snooker Tour players, only Boonyarit Keattikun and Kritsanut Lertsattayathorn (both from Thailand) did not participate in the qualifying rounds or the main draw. Players ranked 17–80 in the world rankings were seeded in qualifying. The following 15 amateur players were invited to compete in qualifying:

 2018 WSF Championship semi-finalists: Luo Honghao, Adam Stefanów, Kristján Helgason, Kacper Filipiak
 2018 WSF Seniors Championship winner: Igor Figueiredo
 2018 WLBS World Women's Championship winner: Ng On-yee
 2018 EBSA European Championship finalists: Harvey Chandler, Jordan Brown
 2018 EBSA European Under-21 Championship runner-up: Tyler Rees
 2018 EBSA European Under-18 Championship winner: Jackson Page
 EBSA Order of Merit 2017/18: Jamie Cope
 2018 World Seniors Championship winner: Aaron Canavan
 WLBS World Ranking No.2: Reanne Evans
 2018 OBSF Oceania Championship winner: Adrian Ridley
 WPBSA Development invitations: Ryan Thomerson, Marvin Lim

Round 1

Round 2

Round 3

Century breaks

Main stage centuries 
A total of 84 century breaks were made by 21 players during the main stage of the World Championship.

 146, 136, 134, 131, 127, 119, 117, 104, 101, 100, 100  John Higgins
 145, 141  Ryan Day
 141  Chris Wakelin
 140, 135, 118, 114, 113, 113, 110, 103, 102, 101, 100, 100  Mark Williams
 140, 126, 125, 124, 121, 106, 105  Kyren Wilson
 137, 102, 101  Shaun Murphy
 133, 132, 129, 129, 128, 124, 117, 113, 103  Barry Hawkins
 133, 122  Mark Allen
 128, 105  Jack Lisowski
 127, 125, 122, 100  Lyu Haotian
 126, 124, 113, 102, 102  Ding Junhui
 126, 115, 108, 106  Ali Carter
 124, 114  Jamie Jones
 123  Stuart Bingham
 122, 105  Ricky Walden
 121, 118, 110, 105  Ronnie O'Sullivan
 121, 112  Thepchaiya Un-Nooh
 120, 109, 103  Joe Perry
 120, 102  Marco Fu
 103, 103, 101, 100, 100  Judd Trump
 101  Stephen Maguire

Qualifying stage centuries 
A total of 111 century breaks – including a maximum break – were made by 53 players during the qualifying stage of the World Championship.

 147, 140, 124, 124, 103  Liang Wenbo
 141, 119  Jamie Cope
 141, 100, 100  Stuart Carrington
 137, 105  Xiao Guodong
 136, 130, 116, 100  Yan Bingtao
 136, 120, 109  Mark Davis
 136, 117, 113, 109  Lyu Haotian
 136  Michael Holt
 135, 133, 125, 103, 102, 101, 100  Ricky Walden
 135  Peter Ebdon
 134, 122, 103  Noppon Saengkham
 133, 102  Ken Doherty
 132, 121, 117, 111, 111, 102  Zhang Anda
 131, 107, 107, 100  Andrew Higginson
 131, 100  David Gilbert
 130  Dominic Dale
 130  Stephen Maguire
 127, 126, 102  Tian Pengfei
 127, 114, 111, 102  Liam Highfield
 127  Christopher Keogan
 126  Zhou Yuelong
 125, 108  Joe Perry
 125, 104  Chris Wakelin
 122, 114, 111, 104, 100  Jack Lisowski
 120  Robert Milkins
 119  Adam Duffy
 118, 109  Alan McManus
 118  Rory McLeod
 118  Hossein Vafaei
 118  Zhao Xintong
 117  Sunny Akani
 114, 101  Jamie Jones
 114  Zhang Yong
 113  Elliot Slessor
 109, 105  Thepchaiya Un-Nooh
 109, 101  Li Hang
 109  Mark Joyce
 108, 104  Gary Wilson
 107, 100, 100  Ryan Day
 106  John Astley
 105, 104, 100  Gerard Greene
 105, 102  Mark King
 105  David Grace
 104, 101, 100  Jimmy Robertson
 104  Sam Craigie
 104  Fergal O'Brien
 104  Daniel Wells
 103, 100  Matthew Stevens
 102  Leo Fernandez
 101  Cao Yupeng
 101  Chen Zhe
 100  Graeme Dott
 100  Mike Dunn

Coverage 
The tournament was broadcast live in the UK by BBC TV and BBC Online, as well as on Eurosport. The event was also broadcast by World Snooker internationally on Facebook, doing so for the second time. Coverage for the qualifying event was also broadcast on Facebook, and the Eurosport Player.

Notes

References 

2018
World Championship
2018 in English sport
Sports competitions in Sheffield
April 2018 sports events in the United Kingdom
May 2018 sports events in the United Kingdom